Baptist Leveson-Gower (c. 1703–1782) was a British Tory politician who sat in the House of Commons for 34 years from 1727 to 1761.

Leveson-Gower was the fourth son  of  John Leveson Gower, 1st Baron Gower, MP, and his wife Lady Catherine Manners, daughter of John Manners, 1st Duke of Rutland.  He entered Westminster School in May 1717, aged 13 and was admitted at St. John’s College, Cambridge on 22 April 1720, aged 16.
 
At the 1727 British general election Leveson-Gower was returned as a Tory Member of Parliament at both Amersham and Newcastle-Under-Lyme, and chose to sit for Newcastle-under-Lyme on his family’s interest. He voted consistently against the Government. He was returned for Newcastle-under-Lyme in a contest at  the 1734 British general election and unopposed at the  1741 British general election.  In December 1744 his brother, Lord Gower, joined the Administration, and he was appointed a Lord of Trade in 1745. He was returned again in 1747 and resigned his office in June 1749. He became a member of the Duke of Bedford’s circle  and in 1751 he split from  Lord Gower and went into opposition with Bedford.

Leveson-Gower was returned at the 1754 British general election and was classed  as a member of the Bedford group, then in opposition. He did not stand in 1761.

Leveson-Gower died unmarried on 4 August 1782. He was the brother of Hon. Thomas and William Leveson-Gower.

References

1700s births
1782 deaths
Younger sons of barons
Members of the Parliament of Great Britain for Newcastle-under-Lyme
British MPs 1727–1734
British MPs 1734–1741
British MPs 1741–1747
British MPs 1747–1754
British MPs 1754–1761